Veselava Manor is a manor house in the historical region of Vidzeme, in northern Latvia.

History 
Veselava Manor was built in 1841 in Eclectic style for the von Campenhausen family, who owned the estate from 1797 until 1921. The building currently houses the Veselava parish administrative offices, community center, post office, credit union, and internet café.

See also
List of palaces and manor houses in Latvia

References

External links
  Veselava Manor

Manor houses in Latvia